Wooden tongue may mean:
 Wooden language, a form of obfuscation in French;
 Actinobacillosis, a disease of livestock